Thomas Creighton may refer to:
 Thomas Creighton (prospector), prospector who found mineral deposits in Saskatchewan
 Thomas C. Creighton (born 1945), member of the Pennsylvania House of Representatives
 Thomas H. Creighton (1865–1942), American lawyer, teacher, and politician in the Illinois House of Representatives 
 Thomas Kelso Creighton (1892–1973), Canadian politician in the Legislative Assembly of Ontario